"The Blue and the Gray" is the thirteenth episode in the twenty-second season of the American animated television series The Simpsons. It originally aired on the Fox network in the United States on February 13, 2011.

Plot
After spending another Valentine's Day alone, Moe attends a seminar led by Dr. Kissingher in the hopes of gaining more confidence with women. Moe takes the doctor’s advice and asks Homer to be his wingman. Meanwhile, Marge discovers her first grey hairs, only to find out from her hairdresser that she is completely grey; the fumes from the chemicals he uses to dye it erase her memory. Seeing a grey-haired couple having a good time unworried about their hair, Marge surprises both her family and the neighborhood by going completely gray and sporting a brand new mature hairdo. Amidst mixed reactions, Bart is not happy when the neighborhood kids tease him about Marge’s look, and Marge is annoyed when neighborhood women believe she is older than she really is.

Unhappy about Marge's look, Homer initially tells her she is his "silver belle" to appease her; but subsequently spends more time helping Moe with women in order to avoid looking at her, during which he becomes increasingly popular with the young ladies. Later, Patty and Selma point out to Marge Homer's true feelings about her look (noting that Homer would not try to be "clever" if he really liked it), this only being made the more obvious to her when two women gossip about his appearance at a club that night. A jealous Marge heads to the club to surprise Homer, but suffers increasing mishaps resulting in her having a witch-like appearance. At the club, she confronts him upon seeing a crowd of women flirting with him, but Homer helps Marge realize that he only has eyes for her and proves that love is still in the Springfield air. Eventually, Marge changes her hair color back to blue to combat her jealousy issues, and Homer dyes his hair blue for her.

Reception
In its original American broadcast, "The Blue and the Gray" was viewed by an estimated 5.618 million households and received a 2.7 rating/7% share among adults between the ages of 18 and 49. This episode marked a 10% drop from the previous episode, "Homer the Father". This might have been due to the episode airing against the 53rd Grammy Awards.

The episode was met with lukewarm reviews from critics, who called it "funny" but "unmemorable". Rob LaZebnik was nominated for a Writers Guild of America Award for Outstanding Writing in Animation at the 64th Writers Guild of America Awards for his script to this episode.

References

External links 
 

2011 American television episodes
The Simpsons (season 22) episodes